Tomislav Milićević (born 29 September 1940) is a former Yugoslav and Serbian footballer who played as a defender.

Playing career
Milićević started out at Napredak Kruševac, before joining Red Star Belgrade in 1960. He later played for the Chicago Mustangs of the North American Soccer League in 1968. After returning to Yugoslavia, Milićević spent some time with Maribor and Radnički Kragujevac. He finished his playing career at Gazélec Ajaccio in 1971.

Post-playing career
After hanging up his boots, Milićević worked in Red Star Belgrade's youth system for over 30 years, discovering and developing many young prospects such as Dejan Stanković and Marko Pantelić, among others.

Honours
Red Star Belgrade
 Yugoslav First League: 1963–64
 Yugoslav Cup: 1963–64

References

External links
 
 

1940 births
Living people
Sportspeople from Kruševac
Yugoslav footballers
Serbian footballers
Association football defenders
FK Napredak Kruševac players
Red Star Belgrade footballers
Chicago Mustangs (1967–68) players
NK Maribor players
FK Radnički 1923 players
Gazélec Ajaccio players
Yugoslav Second League players
Yugoslav First League players
North American Soccer League (1968–1984) players
Ligue 2 players
Yugoslav expatriate footballers
Expatriate soccer players in the United States
Expatriate footballers in France
Yugoslav expatriate sportspeople in the United States
Yugoslav expatriate sportspeople in France
Red Star Belgrade non-playing staff